Murder! is a 1930 British thriller film co-written and directed by Alfred Hitchcock and starring Herbert Marshall, Norah Baring and Edward Chapman. Written by Hitchcock, his wife Alma Reville and Walter C. Mycroft, it is based on the 1928 novel Enter Sir John by Clemence Dane and Helen Simpson. It was Hitchcock's third all-talkie film, after Blackmail (1929) and Juno and the Paycock (1930).

Plot
In 1930, Diana Baring (Norah Baring), a young actress in a travelling theatre troupe, is found in a daze with blood on her clothes, sitting by the murdered body of another young actress, Edna Druce. The poker used to commit the murder was at Diana's feet, but she has no memory of what happened during the minutes the crime was committed. The two young women were thought to have been rivals, and the police arrest her. Diana withholds some important information deliberately, to protect something about the identity of a man that she will not name.

At her trial most of the jury are certain she is guilty. One or two feel that she may have a severe mental illness which meant that she really did have no memory of killing the other woman, but they are convinced that she should still be hanged lest she strike again. One juror, Sir John Menier (Herbert Marshall), a celebrated actor-manager, seems sure she must be innocent, but is brow-beaten into voting "guilty" along with the rest of the jury. Diana is imprisoned, and awaiting hanging.

Sir John feels responsible, as he was the one who had recommended that Diana take the touring job in order for her to get more life experience. It also turns out that Diana has been a fan of his since childhood. She is beautiful, and seems far too honest and straightforward to be a criminal of any kind. Using skills he has learned in the theatre, Sir John investigates the murder with the help of the stage manager Ted Markham (Edward Chapman) and his wife Doucie (Phyllis Konstam). They narrow the possible suspects down to one male actor in the troupe, Handel Fane (Esme Percy), who often plays cross-dressing roles.

During a prison visit with Baring, Sir John learns Fane's secret: he is a half-caste, only passing as white, and Druce threatened to expose him. Later, Sir John cunningly tries to lure a confession out of Fane, by asking him to audition for a new play that Sir John has written, on the subject of the murder. Fane realizes that they know he committed the crime, and that they understand how and why he did it. Fane leaves the audition without confessing, and goes back to his old job; he is a solo trapeze performer in a circus. Sir John and the others go there to confront him again. During his performance, from his high perch he looks down and sees them waiting. Despairing, he knots his access rope into a noose, slips it over his head and jumps to his death. Afterwards, Sir John and Markham discover Fane had written a confession to the murder before his suicide.

We then see Diana, free, and gloriously dressed in white furs, entering a beautiful room and being welcomed warmly by Sir John, who receives her as if he loves her. The camera pulls back and we realise we are watching the last scene of a new play, possibly the new play, in which Diana stars opposite Sir John. They kiss as the curtain falls.

Cast

 Herbert Marshall as Sir John Menier
 Norah Baring as Diana Baring
 Phyllis Konstam as Doucie Markham
 Edward Chapman as Ted Markham
 Miles Mander as Gordon Druce
 Esme Percy as Handel Fane
 Donald Calthrop as Ion Stewart
 Esme V. Chaplin as Prosecuting Counsel
 Amy Brandon-Thomas as Defending Counsel
 Joynson Powell as Judge
 S. J. Warmington as Bennett
 Marie Wright as Miss. Mitcham
 Hannah Jones as Mrs. Didsome
 Una O'Connor as Mrs. Grogram
Members of the Jury
 R.E. Jeffrey as Foreman
 Alan Stainer
 Kenneth Kove
 Guy Pelham Boulton
 Violet Farebrother
 Clare Greet
 Drusilla Wills
 Robert Easton
 William Fazan
 George Smythson
 Ross Jefferson
 Picton Roxborough

Alfred Hitchcock as man, with a female companion, walking along the street, while Edward Chapman is speaking to Herbert Marshall and Phyllis Konstam [uncredited]
Gus McNaughton as Tom Trewitt [uncredited]

Production
The film was made by British International Pictures. It was originally to be released under the same title as the novel, Enter Sir John, but this was changed to the simpler Murder! during shooting. A number of changes were made from the book, including altering the names of the two principal characters. The portrayal of the character Sir John Mernier was loosely based on that of the actor Gerald du Maurier, who was a friend of Hitchcock. Hitchcock later adapted three novels written by du Maurier's daughter Daphne du Maurier: Jamaica Inn (1939), Rebecca (1940) and The Birds (1963). Hitchcock makes his cameo appearance in the film as a man walking past the murder victim's house.

The film's sets were designed by the art director John Mead.

The German language version of the film, Mary (1931), was shot simultaneously on the same set with German-speaking actors. Miles Mander reprised his role as Gordon Druce in Mary, though the character's name was changed to Gordon Moore.

Music
In addition to the original music composed by John Reynders, the film uses the opening of Richard Wagner's Tristan und Isolde prelude in a radio broadcast Sir John is listening to during the shaving scene.

For the filming, an orchestra played the music live on the set. Hitchcock described the filming of this scene to François Truffaut in the book-length interview Hitchcock/Truffaut (New York: Simon & Schuster, 1967). In the early days of sound film, there was no way to post-dub sound, so Hitchcock had Herbert Marshall's voice recorded on a phonograph record, which was played back during the filming of the scene, while the orchestra played the "radio" music live.

Copyright and home video status
Murder!, like all of Hitchcock's other British films, is copyrighted worldwide but has been heavily bootlegged on home video. Despite this, various licensed, restored releases have appeared on DVD, Blu-ray and video on demand services from Optimum in the UK, Lionsgate and Kino Lorber in the US, and others.

References

Bibliography
 Chandler, Charlotte. It's only a movie: Alfred Hitchcock : a personal biography. First Applause, 2006.
 Yacowar, Maurice. Hitchcock's British Films. Wayne State University Press, 2010.

External links
 
 
 
 
 Murder! at the British Film Institute's Screenonline
 Alfred Hitchcock Collectors’ Guide: Murder! at Brenton Film
''Cinema Then, Cinema Now: Murder!' a 1990 discussion of the film hosted by Jerry Carlson of CUNY TV

1930 films
Films based on crime novels
Films directed by Alfred Hitchcock
British black-and-white films
Films shot at British International Pictures Studios
British multilingual films
Films based on British novels
Juries in fiction
Films set in 1930
British drama films
1930 drama films
1930 multilingual films
1930s English-language films
1930s British films